Lydia Klinkenberg (born 3 October 1981) is a Belgian politician, currently serving as Minister of Education and Scientific Research of the Government of the German-speaking Community. She is a member of the ProDG party.

Career 
She was first elected to the Parliament of the German-speaking Community in 2009. 

In October 2020, she was named Minister of Education for the German-speaking community in Belgium. In March 2021, she gathered with the Flemish and Wallonian education ministers to call on the federal government to make teachers a priority in COVID-19 vaccination targets.

See also 
 Lydia Klinkenberg - Official website

References 

Women government ministers of Belgium
1981 births
Living people